Harrisia bonplandii is a species of cactus. The cactus plants in the Gran Chaco (Paraguay, Argentina, Bolivia) are generally called tuna and this specific variety reina de la noche (queen of the night). Fruits and roots are edible and well known to the native nations of the Gran Chaco.

Names of this cactus in the different languages of the native Nations are: Ayoreo Nation: daturirai / datura; Enxet Nation: laapang; Nivaclé Nation: sôtôyuc. In Argentina it is also known as pasacana/ulua. The plant remains often unnoticed in the forest, but can not be overseen when it blossoms only in the night and where its Spanish name originates.

The name bonplandii honors the French scientist Aimé Bonpland.

Description
Harrisia bonplandii is stem scandent, clambering or sprawling and grows up leaning-climbing. The stems have diameters of up to 5 centimeters and are up to 2.5 meters long. They are three to four edged with flat faces. Their edges are sharp and wavy. The single strong central spine is up to 2.5 centimeters long. The four to five side spines reach a length of 4 to 5 millimeters  The flowers reach a length of 20 to 25 centimeters  Their pericarpel and the corolla tube are virtually without wool, but filled with large scurf’s. The spherical, redfruits are edible and strongly tuberculate. They have diameters of 4 to 4.5 centimetres.

Distribution and habitat
Harrisia bonplandii can be found in the southwest of Brasil, in Paraguay, in Bolivia and in the north of Argentina in the Chaco.
The first description as Cereus bonplandii was realized at 1837 from Ludwig Georg Karl Pfeiffer. Nathaniel Lord Britton and Joseph Nelson Rose classified the type in 1920 as Genus Harrisia. Nomenclatural synonyms are Eriocereus bonplandii (J.Parm. & Pfeiff.) Riccob. (1909) and Harrisia pomanensis subsp. bonplandii (J.Parm. & Pfeiff.) P.J.Braun & Esteves (1994, not the correct Name ICBN-Artikel 11.4).

References

Literature 
 

bonplandii
Cacti of South America
Gran Chaco
Flora of Argentina
Flora of Bolivia
Flora of Paraguay